Royal Air Force Woolfox Lodge or more simply RAF Woolfox Lodge is a former Royal Air Force station next to the A1 road in Rutland, UK. The airfield is split between the parishes of Empingham and Greetham. It was open from 1940 until 1965.

History
Woolfox opened as a reserve landing ground for RAF Cottesmore then became a satellite to RAF North Luffenham in October 1941. Full station status was granted from June 1943. The wartime airfield comprised three tarmac runways and one Type B1 and four T2 aircraft hangars.  There was temporary accommodation for 1,149 male and 252 female personnel.

RAF Woolfox Lodge was used in later years as a relief landing ground but the runways deteriorated to such a degree that the airfield had to be closed to flying by spring 1954. In 1960 a Bristol Bloodhound surface-to-air missile site under No. 62 Squadron RAF was positioned in a secure area adjacent to the A1 road near the former technical site.

RAF units and aircraft

The following units were here at some point:
 No. 3 Lancaster Finishing School RAF
 No. 7 Flying Training School RAF
 No. 14 OTU (see List of Royal Air Force Operational Training Units)
 No. 29 OTU (see List of Royal Air Force Operational Training Units)
 No. 33 Heavy Glider Maintenance Section
 No. 61 Squadron Conversion Flight RAF
 No. 259 Maintenance Unit RAF
 No. 1429 (Czech Operational Training) Flight RAF
 No. 1665 Heavy Conversion Unit RAF

Current use
The site is now used for agriculture and employment purposes.

The Cold War-era Bloodhound missile site, while derelict, is well preserved. Hardstandings for 32 Bloodhound missiles are present. During the summer of 2018 the parch marks of various World War II-era buildings became visible on the former technical site within the boundaries of the missile site.

The landowner in 2019 has proposed it as a site for a possible garden village.

References

Bibliography

External links
 https://web.archive.org/web/20081207003349/http://www.raf.mod.uk/bombercommand/s85.html

Royal Air Force stations of World War II in the United Kingdom
Woolfox Lodge